Parque del Carmen (Carmen's Park) is a park in Santa Clara, Cuba, which honors the city's founding. It is located in the ward (reparto) El Carmen, not too far from Martyr's Park and the railway station.

Overview
This old plaza is host to a small park centered by Saint Carmen's Church, a colonial building which originally also included the city's first school. In front of it, there is a gray marble monument surrounding a Tamarind tree indicating the foundation of Santa Clara. Each pillar supporting the bar represent the 7 families who moved to the site in 1689 from the town of Remedios near the north coast.

Next to the Foundation is another monument which honors Captain Roberto Rodriguez, known as “El Vaquerito” (little cowboy), a young soldier who died in the Battle of Santa Clara. When notified of his death, revolutionary leader Che Guevara said: “Today it is like I have lost 300 men”.

Gallery

Bibliography
 Garcia Gonzalez, Luis - Al pie del Tamarindo. (Colección Escambray, PUBLICIGRAF (R),1993)

See also
Parque Vidal

References

External links

Tourist attractions in Santa Clara, Cuba
Parks in Cuba